Deanna Bogart (born September 5, 1959, Detroit, Michigan, United States), is an American blues/fusion singer, pianist, and saxophone player/composer/arranger/producer.

Background
She began her career in the Baltimore and Washington D.C. area of Maryland with the ensemble Cowboy Jazz, and following that band's breakup in 1986, a stint playing with Root Boy Slim.  In the early 1990s she began her solo career.
Awards: 4x BMA (Blues Music Awards) Horn instrumentalist of the year. 
In 2013, Bogart was nominated for a Blues Music Award in the 'Pinetop Perkins Piano Player' category.

Discography
1991: Out to Get You
1992: Crossing Borders
1996: New Address
1998: The Great Unknown
2001: Deanna Bogart Band Live
2002: Timing Is Everything
2006: Real Time
2009: Eleventh Hour
2012: Pianoland
2014: Just a Wish Away

References

External links
Official Deanna Bogart website

1959 births
Living people
American rock musicians
American blues singers
American blues pianists
Jump blues musicians
Boogie-woogie pianists
Rhythm and blues musicians from New Orleans
Singers from Louisiana
20th-century American women pianists
20th-century American pianists
20th-century American women singers
21st-century American women pianists
21st-century American pianists
21st-century American women singers
Blind Pig Records artists
20th-century American singers